Jakub Wolny (born 15 May 1995) is a Polish ski jumper, a member of the national team, a double 2014 Junior World Champion.

Personal life
Jakub Wolny was born in Bielsko-Biała, but lives in Wilkowice.

Career
His first jump he gave in 2002. Since the season 2004/2005 has performed in Lotos Cup. In May 2013 he appeared in the National Junior Olympics, where he won three gold medals (two individual and one with team). On December 27, 2013 he won the first points of the winter edition of the Continental Cup - he was 8th in Engelberg. On January 19, 2014 debuted in World Cup competition in Zakopane, where was 45th. On January 31, 2014 won individual a gold medal at the World Junior Championships 2014 in Val di Fiemme. Next day he won a gold medal again with Polish team Klemens Murańka, Krzysztof Biegun and Aleksander Zniszczoł.

World Championships

World Cup

Season standings

Individual starts

Team victories

References

External links
 

1995 births
Living people
Polish male ski jumpers
Sportspeople from Bielsko-Biała
Sportspeople from Silesian Voivodeship